Eatoniella mortoni is a species of marine gastropod mollusc in the family Eatoniellidae. First described by Winston Ponder in 1965, it is endemic to the waters of New Zealand. The species has been used to study the effects of ocean acidification, as it is known to thrive in carbon dioxide-rich environments.

Taxonomy

The species was described as Eatoniella (Dardanula) mortoni in 1965 by Winston Ponder, who named it after New Zealand biologist John Morton. Morton had assisted Ponder during his early investigations into the species. Ponder synonymised several previously-named genera, including Iredale's 1915 genus Dardanula, which was retained as a subgenus of Eatoniella.

Description

Eatoniella mortoni has a solid, conical, smooth shell. The shells are widely variable in colour, from purple-tinted dark grey to pale yellow-grey. The species measures 1.85 millimetres by 1.13 millimetres.

Distribution

The species is endemic to New Zealand. The holotype was collected by Ponder himself on 11 December 1961, at Days Bay in Wellington. The species is known to occur on both coasts of the North Island and South Island. In addition, the species can be found on the Chatham Islands and the volcanic island Whakaari / White Island.

Typically the species can be found on algae at low tide, and underneath intertidal rocks, and often lives on kelp species such as Ecklonia radiata.

Ocean acidification studies

Eatoniella mortoni has been used as a species to study ocean acidification, as the species benefits from living in carbon dioxide-rich environments and remains localised, especially specimens sourced from the volcanic island Whakaari / White Island, due to their lifetime exposure to carbon dioxide vents. Eatoniella mortoni can produce more crystalline, durable and less porous shells at natural carbon dioxide vents.

References

Eatoniellidae
Gastropods described in 1965
Gastropods of New Zealand
Endemic fauna of New Zealand
Endemic molluscs of New Zealand
Molluscs of the Pacific Ocean
Taxa named by Winston Ponder